This is a comprehensive list of flags used in Albania.

State flags

Presidential flags

Ensigns

Military flags

Police flags

Maritime flags

Historical flags

Medieval flags

Diaspora flags

Personalized flags

Postcard flags

Trivial flags

Albanian flags used in Kosovo

See also
 Flag of Albania
 Coat of arms of Albania (Armorial)
 Albanian heraldry
 List of flags of Kosovo

References

 
Lists and galleries of flags
Flags
Flags
Flags